Lara A. Thompson is a biomedical engineer at the University of the District of Columbia. She is known for her work in human mobility and was a 2022 recipient of the National Science Foundations Alan T. Waterman Award.

Biography 
Thompson went to high school in New Hampshire, has a BS in mechanical engineering from the University of Massachusetts Lowell (2003), and an MS in aeronautical and astronautical engineering from Stanford University (2005). She earned a PhD in biomedical engineering from the Harvard University / Massachusetts Institute of Technology Program in Health Sciences and Technology(2013). Following her PhD she joined the faculty at the University of the District of Columbia and, as of 2022, she is an associate professor in mechanical engineering.

Thompson is known for her work on human mobility in impaired and unimpaired populations. Her PhD work was on vestibular implants, where she examined the importance of postural control and the impact of invasive vestibular implants on posture. With funding from the National Science Foundation, Thompson established a biomedical engineering lab to assess balance and movement in people.

Selected publications

Awards and honors 
In 2019 Thompson was honored at the Black Engineer of the Year Awards as an innovator in STEM at Historically Black Colleges and Universities. In 2022 Thompson received the Alan T. Waterman Award from the United States' National Science Foundation.

References 

Living people
University of Massachusetts Lowell alumni
Stanford University alumni
Harvard University alumni
Massachusetts Institute of Technology alumni
University of the District of Columbia faculty
Biomedical engineers
Women engineers
Year of birth missing (living people)